Hwang Jun-ho (born August 3, 1993) is a cross-country skier from South Korea. He competed for South Korea at the 2014 Winter Olympics in the cross country skiing events.

References

1993 births
Living people
Olympic cross-country skiers of South Korea
Cross-country skiers at the 2014 Winter Olympics
South Korean male cross-country skiers
Cross-country skiers at the 2017 Asian Winter Games
Asian Games medalists in cross-country skiing
Asian Games bronze medalists for South Korea
Medalists at the 2017 Asian Winter Games
Competitors at the 2015 Winter Universiade